Clovelly is a suburb in the Cape Peninsula area of Cape Town in South Africa.

In biology, Clovelly is home to several seaweeds found only around the Cape Peninsula, including Chaetomorpha, Cladophora and Laurenciophila minima.

References

Suburbs of Cape Town